Francis Cullimore (born 13 December 1976) is an Australian-born New Zealand former elite athlete, He is a five time multiple sporting professional & Rugby Union/league dual international.

Born in Brisbane, Australia, Cullimore moved to Auckland when he was 7 after his father died, settling in Northland. He grew up in Whangarei, New Zealand, and attended Tikipunga primary & High School. He played rugby league for the Junior Kiwis and was signed by the Auckland Warriors to a two-year scholarship. Cullimore represented New Zealand in rugby league sevens, playing in the Rugby League Coca-Cola World Sevens tournament, and also selected  for New Zealand Māori. Cullimore then moved to Australia and played lower grades for the Illawarra Steelers and a brief stint with Manly Sea Eagles.

He decided to switched codes rugby union, playing for the New South Wales under-21s. Nsw A & Moving on to super rugby with the Waratahs, debuting in 2001, he also became a dual international after making the Australian men's 7s team  and represented Australia in rugby sevens.

He was also selected to go to the 2010 Vancouver Winter Olympics with the Australian bobsleigh team after a successful North American training camp. Unfortunately, a leg injury ruling him out. Cullimore then trained and fought as a mixed martial arts fighter turning pro with a 3–1 record

He later trained in natural body building, placing 3rd at the Australian Nationals ANB & International Natural Bodybuilding Association heavyweight divisions and appeared in the Nation's top hit TV show Australian Ninja Warrior Australian Ninja Warrior (season 1 & 2 making the semi-finals for Australian Ninja Warrior.)

Francis Cullimore has now moved away from the sporting arena & all his focus is gone into creating a successful landscaping business, Gardenking Landscape & maintenance.

References

New Zealand rugby league players
Junior Kiwis players
Australian rugby union players
New South Wales Waratahs players
New Zealand Māori rugby league team players
Australia international rugby sevens players
Male rugby sevens players
Australian male bobsledders
New Zealand emigrants to Australia
Australian male mixed martial artists
Australian bodybuilders
1976 births
New Zealand Māori rugby union players
Living people